Dvin (or , ; ; also Duin or Dwin in ancient sources) was a large commercial city and the capital of early medieval Armenia. It was situated north of the previous ancient capital of Armenia, the city of Artaxata, along the banks of the Metsamor River, 35 km to the south of modern Yerevan.  The site of the ancient city is currently not much more than a large hill located between modern Hnaberd (just off the main road through Hnaberd) and Verin Dvin, Armenia.  Systematic excavations at Dvin that have proceeded since 1937 have produced an abundance of materials, which have shed light into the Armenian culture of the 5th to the 13th centuries.

Name 
Ancient Armenian literary sources almost always give the name of the ancient city of Dvin as Dowin, although Dwin or Duin were eventually widespread. Later authors favored the Dvin appellation, which is the most common form given in scholarly literature. The word was thought by Moses of Khorene of Middle Iranian origin, meaning hill, which was followed up in modern scholarly literature, but actually derives from a misunderstanding of Faustus of Byzantium.

History 

The ancient city of Dvin was built by Khosrov III Kotak in 335 on a site of an ancient settlement and fortress from the 3rd millennium BC.  Since then, the city had been used as the primary residence of the Armenian Kings of the Arsacid dynasty. Dvin boasted a population of about 100,000 citizens in various professions, including arts and crafts, trade, fishing, etc.

After the fall of the Armenian Kingdom in 428, Dvin became the residence of Sassanid appointed marzpans (governors), Byzantine kouropalates and later Umayyad- and Abbasid-appointed ostikans (governors). Under Arsacid rule, Dvin prospered as one of the most populous and wealthiest cities east of Constantinople. Its prosperity continued even after the partition of Armenia between Romans and Sassanid Persians, when it became the provincial capital of Persian Armenia, and eventually it became a target during the height of the Early Muslim conquests. According to Sebeos and Catholicos John V the Historian, Dvin was captured by the Arabs in 640 during the reign of Constans II and Catholicos Ezra. During the Arab conquest of Armenia, Dvin was captured and pillaged in 640, in the first raids. On January 6, 642 the Arabs stormed and took the city, with many deaths. Dvin became the center of the Muslim province of Arminiya, the Arabs called the city Dabil.

Although Armenia was a battleground between Arabs and Byzantine forces for the next two centuries, in the 9th century it still flourished. Frequent earthquakes and continued warfare led to the decline of the city from the beginning of the 10th century. During a major earthquake in 893, the city was destroyed, along with most of its 70,000 inhabitants.

Following a devastating Buyid raid in 1021, which sacked the city, Dvin was captured by the Kurdish Shaddadids of Ganja, and ruled by Abu'l-Aswar Shavur ibn Fadl, who successfully defended it against three Byzantine attacks in the latter half of the 1040s.

In 1064, the Seljuks occupied the city. The Shaddadids continued to rule the city as Seljuk vassals until the Georgian King George III conquered the city in 1173. In 1201–1203, during the reign of Queen Tamar, the city was again under Georgian rule. In 1236, the city was completely destroyed by Mongols.

Dvin was the birthplace of Najm ad-Din Ayyub and Asad ad-Din Shirkuh bin Shadhi, Kurdish generals in the service of the Seljuks; Najm ad-Din Ayyub's son, Saladin, was the founder of the Ayyubid dynasty. Saladin was born in Tikrit, Iraq, but his family had originated from the ancient city of Dvin.

Cathedral of St. Grigor

Situated in the central square of the ancient city was the Cathedral of Saint Grigor. It was originally constructed in the 3rd century as a triple-nave pagan temple with seven pairs of interior structural supports. The temple was rebuilt in the 4th century as a Christian church, with a pentahedral apse that protruded sharply on its eastern side. In the middle of the 5th century, an exterior arched gallery was added to the existing structure. At the time that the cathedral was built, it was the largest in Armenia and measured 30.41 meters by 58.17 meters.

Ornate decorations adorned the interior and the exterior of the building. The capitals of the columns were decorated with fern-like relief, while the cornices were carved in the design of three interlaced strands. The interior floor of the structure was made up of mosaic multi-colored soft-toned slabs in a geometric pattern, while the floor of the apse was decorated in the 7th century with a mosaic of smaller stone tiles representing the Holy Virgin. It is the most ancient mosaic depiction of her in Armenia. By the middle of the 7th century, the cathedral was rebuilt into a cruciform domed church with apses that protruded off of its lateral facades. All that remains of the cathedral today are the stone foundations uncovered during archaeological excavations in the 20th century.

See also 
Zacharias I of Armenia

References

Sources

External links

 Armeniapedia.org: Ruins of Dvin
 Iranica article on Dvin

Former capitals of Armenia
 
Populated places in Ararat Province
Sasanian cities